Ramazan Shamilovich Isayev (born 17 January 1998) is a Russian football player who plays for Naftan Novopolotsk.

Career

Club career
He made his professional debut in the Russian Football National League for FC Torpedo Armavir on 12 July 2015 in a game against FC Zenit-2 St. Petersburg.

He then played the first half of the 2016–17 season with Radnički Niš. He made 2 appearances with Radnički in the Serbian SuperLiga.

On 9 December 2019, Ararat Yerevan announced the signing of Isayev from FC Yerevan on a contract until June 2021.

References

External links
 Player page on the FNL website
 

1998 births
Footballers from Makhachkala
Living people
Russian footballers
Russian expatriate footballers
FC Armavir players
FC Noah players
FC Yerevan players
FC Dynamo Brest players
FK Radnički Niš players
FC Belshina Bobruisk players
FC Naftan Novopolotsk players
Serbian SuperLiga players
Belarusian Premier League players
Russian First League players
Armenian Premier League players
Association football forwards
Russian expatriate sportspeople in Armenia
Russian expatriate sportspeople in Belarus
Russian expatriate sportspeople in Serbia
Expatriate footballers in Armenia
Expatriate footballers in Belarus
Expatriate footballers in Serbia